The 1976 New York Jets season was the seventeenth season for the team and the seventh in the National Football League. It began with the team trying to improve upon its 3–11 record from 1975 under new head coach Lou Holtz. The Jets again finished with a record of 3–11, which combined with the resignation of Holtz with one game left in the season to become coach at the University of Arkansas, prompted John Facenda to say about the Jets during the NFL Films highlight film for that season “Perhaps the best thing to say about the 1976 New York Jets season is that it’s over”.

The only teams that the Jets defeated in 1976 were the 2–12 Buffalo Bills (twice) and the 0–14 Tampa Bay Buccaneers. The Jets were 0–9 vs. teams with a winning record.

The 1976 season was also the twelfth and final year with the Jets for quarterback Joe Namath.

Offseason

Draft

Undrafted free agents

Personnel

Staff

Roster

Schedule

Standings

In popular culture 
 The television series Barney Miller referenced the game between the Buccaneers playing at the Jets, in the third season episode “The Recluse”, in which Yemana (Jack Soo) had tickets to the Jets/Tampa Bay game. When asked “Why?’, his response, “They were on sale”. The Tampa Bay Buccaneers finished 0–14 the same season.

Notes

References

External links 
 1976 statistics

New York Jets
New York Jets seasons
New York Jets season
1970s in Queens